The February 2010 Khyber bombing was a suicide bombing  in Khyber Agency in Pakistan, on February 10, 2010.  At least 19 people including 13 policemen were killed in a suicide bomb attack against a police patrol.

Background
Khyber Agency  is located in North West Pakistan.  It is on the main supply route for NATO forces stationed in Afghanistan.  It has seen several militant attacks against convoys carrying supplies in the past.

Attack
According to officials a local police officer Zurmat Khan appeared to be the target of the attack.  Zurmat Khan had been nominated for a gallantry award Tamgha-i-Jurat which was to have been given on March 23.  He had been previously awarded Rs 350,000 for his bravery in a prior operation against Taliban.   He was leading a patrol when the suicide bomber ran towards his vehicle and detonated himself.  Militants had earlier attacked his home but no one was injured in that attack.  The attack happened on the road NATO uses to supply troops in Afghanistan.

Aftermath

No group has yet claimed responsibility for this attack.  A senior police officer in Peshawar stated the most likely the bombing was carried out by Taliban in retaliation for killing of Hakimullah Mehsud.  Altaf Hussain chief of Muttahida Qaumi Movement strongly condemned the blast and expressed his grief.  Rehmatullah Kakar Pakistan's Minister for Housing and Works also condemned the attack

See also
List of terrorist incidents, 2010
List of terrorist incidents in Pakistan since 2001

References

2010 murders in Pakistan
Mass murder in 2010
Suicide car and truck bombings in Pakistan
Terrorist incidents in Pakistan in 2010
Khyber District
Crime in Khyber Pakhtunkhwa
February 2010 events in Pakistan